The triangle of auscultation is a relative thinning of the musculature of the back, situated along the medial border of the scapula which allows for improved listening to the lungs.

Boundaries 
It has the following boundaries:

 medially, by the inferior portion of the trapezius
 inferiorly, by the latissimus dorsi
 laterally, by the medial border of the scapula

The superficial floor of the triangle is formed by the lateral portion of the erector spinae muscles. Deep to these muscles are the osseous portions of the 6th and 7th ribs and the internal and external intercostal muscles.

Clinical significance
The triangle of auscultation is useful for assessment using a pulmonary auscultation and thoracic procedures. Due to the relative thinning of the musculature of the back in the triangle, the posterior thoracic wall is closer to the skin surface, making respiratory sounds audible more clearly with a stethoscope. On the left side, the cardiac orifice of the stomach lies deep to the triangle. In days before X-rays were discovered, the sound of swallowed liquids were auscultated over this triangle to confirm an oesophageal tumour.
To better expose the floor of the triangle up of the posterior thoracic wall in the 6th and 7th intercostal space, a patient is asked to fold their arms across their chest, laterally rotating the scapulae, while bending forward at the trunk, somewhat resembling the fetal position.

The triangle of auscultation can be used as a surgical approach path. It can also be used for applying a nerve block known as the rhomboid intercostal block, which can be used to relieve pain after rib fractures, and  a thoracotomy. This nerve block is usually appled by injection into the upper intercostal muscle plane and below the rhombic muscles.

References

External links 
 
 Overview and diagram at ithaca.edu

Anatomy